Kim Igyo (1764–25 August 1832) was a scholar-official and Uuijeong of the Joseon dynasty Korea.

He was also diplomat and ambassador, representing Joseon interests in the 12th Edo period diplomatic mission to the Tokugawa shogunate in Japan.

1811 mission to Japan
Kim Igyo was the leader selected by Sunjo of Joseon to head a mission to Japan in 1811.  This diplomatic mission functioned to the advantage of both the Japanese and the Koreans as a channel for maintainining a political foundation for trade.

This delegation was explicitly identified by the Joseon court as a "Communication Envoy" (tongsinsa). The mission was understood to signify that relations were "normalized".

The Joseon monarch's ambassador and retinue traveled only as far as Tsushima. The representatives of shōgun Ienari met the mission on the island which is located in the middle of the Korea Strait between the Korean Peninsula and Kyushu.

See also
 Joseon diplomacy
 Joseon missions to Japan
 Joseon tongsinsa

Notes

References

 Daehwan, Noh.  "The Eclectic Development of Neo-Confucianism and Statecraft from the 18th to the 19th Century", Korea Journal (Winter 2003).
 Lewis, James Bryant. (2003). Frontier contact between chosŏn Korea and Tokugawa Japan. London: Routledge. 
 Walker, Brett L.  "Foreign Affairs and Frontiers in Early Modern Japan: A Historiographical Essay", Early Modern Japan. Fall, 2002, pp. 44–62, 124–128.
 Walraven, Boudewijn and Remco E. Breuker. (2007). Korea in the middle: Korean studies and area studies; Essays in Honour of Boudewijn Walraven. Leiden: CNWS Publications. ;

External links
 Joseon Tongsinsa Cultural Exchange Association ; 
 조선통신사연구 (Journal of Studies in Joseon Tongsinsa) 

1764 births
1832 deaths
19th-century Korean people
Korean diplomats